The Montenegro national futsal team is controlled by the Football Association of Montenegro, the governing body for futsal in Montenegro and represents the country in international futsal competitions, such as the World Cup and the European Championships. The head coach of Monetenegro national futsal team is Sveto Ljesar.

Competition history

FIFA Futsal World Cup

 2008 – did not qualify
 2012 – did not qualify
 2016 – did not qualify
 2020 - did not qualify

UEFA Futsal Championship

 Portugal 2007 - did not qualify
 Hungary 2010 - did not qualify
 Croatia 2012 - did not qualify
 Belgium 2014 - did not qualify
 Serbia 2016 - did not qualify
 Slovenia 2018 - did not qualify
 Netherlands 2022 - TBD

See also
Montenegrin Futsal First League

References

External links
 Football Association of Montenegro (Montenegrin)

Montenegro
Futsal
Futsal in Montenegro